The molecular formula C14H16N4 (molar mass: 240.30 g/mol, exact mass: 240.1375 u) may refer to:

 Imiquimod
 Budralazine

Molecular formulas